This is a list of 1966 events that occurred in the Socialist Republic of Romania.

Incumbents
President: Nicolae Ceaușescu
Prime Minister: Ion Gheorghe Maurer

Events

March

 March 15 – The decennial census is held in Romania, and counted the population of Romania on that date.

June

 June 19-25 – 1966 World Ninepin Bowling Classic Championships is held in Bucharest.

July

 July 7 – At the Warsaw Pact conference in Bucharest, Romania makes a joint declaration along with the European Communist nations to send volunteers to Vietnam if requested for such support by the North Vietnamese government.

August

 August 11 – A Lisunov Li-2 airliner, operated by Tarom crashed in the Lotriora Valley in Romania, near the city of Sibiu, killing all 24 people on board.

October

 October 1-9 – EuroBasket Women 1966 of the European Women Basketball Championship''' is held in Romania.

 Decree 770 is personally sanctioned by Ceaușescu, and signed by the communist Romanian government in 1967.

Births

February
 February 11 –Cristina Elena Grigoraș, retired Romanian artistic gymnast

September
September 6 – Emil Boc, 61st Prime Minister of Romania

Deaths

March
 March 9 – Duiliu Marcu, architect (born 1885).

August
 August 28 – Leontin Sălăjan, Communist military and political leader (born 1913).

October
 October 6 – Mitchell Fields (Mendel Feldman), 65, Romanian-American sculptor.

References

Years of the 20th century in Romania
1960s in Romania
 
Romania
Romania